Xinyi District or Sinyi District is the seat of the Taipei City Government and Taipei City Council. The district includes Taipei 101, Taipei International Convention Center, Taipei World Trade Center, National Sun Yat-sen Memorial Hall and various shopping malls and entertainment venues, making it the most cosmopolitan district of Taipei. Xinyi District is also considered the financial district of Taipei.

The district is a prime shopping area in Taipei, anchored by a number of department stores and malls. In addition, numerous high-end restaurants are located in the area.

History and geography 
During Japanese rule (1895–1945),  covered modern day Xinyi and Songshan districts. The village was named after Matsuyama City in Japan and formed part of Shichisei District, Taihoku Prefecture. Matsuyama Village was incorporated into Taihoku City (modern-day Taipei) in 1938. It was renamed Songshan District in 1945.

In 1990, Songshan District was split in two as part of a citywide reorganization. The southern half became Xinyi District while the northern half retained its name. The present border of Xinyi runs along Civic Boulevard. Xinyi is separated from the Nangang District on the east by Fude St.; from Wenshan District in the south by Baozijiang and Poneikeng Mountains; and from Daan District in the west by the Zhuangjing Tunnel, Keelung Road and Guangfu Road. Development of the area in the 1990s transformed Xinyi into a modern shopping district which by 2010 boasted the highest property values in Taiwan.

Government institutions

 Taipei City Council
 Taipei City Government
 Veterans Affairs Council
 Public Construction Commission

Institutions
 Australian Office in Taipei
 British Office Taipei
 Canadian Trade Office in Taipei
 German Institute Taipei
 India-Taipei Association
 Mexican Trade Services Documentation and Cultural Office
 Nigeria Trade Office in Taiwan, R.O.C.
 Commercial Office of Peru to Taipei
 Hong Kong Economic, Trade and Cultural Office
 Macau Economic and Cultural Office

Education 
 Taipei Medical University
 Taipei Municipal Song Shan Senior High School
 Taipei Municipal Yongchun High School
 Songshan High School of Agriculture and Industry
 Taipei Municipal Liugong Junior High School()
 Taipei Municipal Xin'Yi Junior High School
 Taipei Municipal Xingya Junior High School
 Taipei Municipal Fude Elementary School
 Taipei Municipal Bo'ai Elementary School
 Taipei Municipal Sanxing Elementary School

Famous Landmarks and Places of interest

 Taipei 101
Visitors can visit the 89th floor observatory by means of the world's second fastest elevator (63 km/h or 37.5 mph). In addition, there is the Taipei 101 Mall, which features famous international brands like Shiatzy Chen, Dolce & Gabbana, Gucci, Coach, Louis Vuitton, and Roots. The mall also has Häagen-Dazs, Barista Coffee, Dante Coffee, and a handful of fancy restaurants. Also, there is a large food court with McDonald's, KFC, and many more.

 Taipei City Hall
Taipei City Hall is located on City Hall Rd.. The plaza outside city hall, Citizen's Square, is often used as a concert venue including the annual New Year's celebrations.

 Shin Kong Mitsukoshi
Shin Kong Mitsukoshi, a high-end Japanese department store, operates four buildings in the district. The buildings are (in order from least floor space to most floor space): A4, which specializes in women's fashion, has, among other retail stores, a Hands Tailung store, a Häagen-Dazs, and a supermarket; A9, which houses expensive international boutiques like Gucci, Chanel, and Coach, and has a large fnac store on B2; A11, which features products for the entire family, a Mister Donut, a food court, a Starbucks, and a supermarket; and A8, which holds just about everything for anyone and a food court featuring Beard Papa, MOS Burger, McDonald's, Au Bon Pain, etc. Each building has a number of restaurants, featuring cuisines from around the world.

 Eslite Bookstore
Eslite Bookstore, Taiwan's premier bookstore, opened their flagship store in the district in early 2006. Spanning over 7 floors, this bookstore is the largest in Taiwan. The bookstore has an expansive magazine collection (especially foreign magazines), a floor dedicated to children's books, a Japanese bookstore, art bookstore, Simplified Chinese book collection, and more. There are event halls where authors address their articles or topics related to their books. In addition to books, the bookstore also offers clothing and accessories (with brands like fcuk, Lacoste, and Adidas), stationery, CDs, a Starbucks, an Apple retailer, and a food court.

 Neo19
Neo19, located on Songshou Rd., houses a number of restaurants, a health club, a nightclub and lounge bar. The restaurants at Neo 19 include Chili's, Romano's Macaroni Grill, Azabusabo, Mo-Mo-Paradise, Gloucester, and Watami. The nightclub is Room18, renowned for hosting international DJs and local celebrities.  The lounge bar is BarCode, located on the 5th floor which features an open-air patio, and an exclusive VIP area, named The Den.

 
With 17 screens, this megaplex is a popular place in Taipei to see films from all over the world, often released on the same day as the country of origin. The complex also has a food court that includes outlets of Burger King, Häagen-Dazs, etc., Sasa, and an arcade.

 ATT 4 FUN (formerly New York New York)
Located at 12, Songshou Rd, this building was formerly called New York New York. After ATT Group bought the mall in 2010 it was closed, remodeled, and opened under the name ATT 4 FUN in the second half of 2011. The mall features 11 floors of shopping, restaurants, and clubs. Among the many attractions are a Starbucks, McDonald's, Mister Donut, and Myst Club.

 Historic Coal Mines
Xinyi District has several historic coal mines from the Japanese colonial period. Two of them have been renovated: the Hexing Mine, Alley 471, Lane 150, Section 5, Xinyi Road, and the Dexing Mine near the trailhead of the Tiaomi Trail, Alley 100, Lane 600, Wuxing Road.

 Martial Law Era Victims of Political Violence Memorial Park
This historic memorial of victims of the "White Terror" is located on a hillside overlooking the present Taipei 101 shopping district.

 Xiangshan
A 183m (600ft) tall mountain with views of Taipei at the peak. Its trail begins about 700m (2300ft) south of Exit 2 of the Xiangshan metro station.

Economy
Many corporate headquarters and hotels are located in Xinyi District.

Tallest Buildings 150m+

Transportation

Rail 
Xinyi District is served by the following stations of the Taipei Metro:
Wenhu line: Linguang, Liuzhangli
Tamsui–Xinyi line: Xiangshan, Taipei 101–World Trade Center
Bannan line: Sun Yat-sen Memorial Hall, Taipei City Hall, Yongchun, Houshanpi metro station
Circular line: Yongchun, Xiangshan, Sanzhangli

In addition, the north of the district is served by the Taiwan Railways Administration Songshan station.

Road 
Buses to Xinyi District are also plentiful from all parts of Taipei, with a major bus terminal at Taipei City Hall Bus Station. There are also many arteries and freeways in the area, including Zhongxiao East Rd. (part of Sec. 4 & Sec 5), Keelung Rd. (first 2 sections), Xinyi Rd. (part of Sec. 4 & Sec 5), Renai Rd. (part of Sec. 4), Provincial Highway 5, and the Civic Boulevard Expressway.

Pedestrian 
Shin Kong Mitsukoshi, Vieshow Cinemas, ATT 4 Fun, and Taipei 101 Mall are interconnected by an elevated walkway.

Gallery

See also

 Taipei

References

External links 

  
 About Xinyi District - Taipei City

Districts of Taipei
Shopping districts and streets in Taiwan